Yvonne Roberts (born 1948) is an English journalist. She was born in Newport Pagnell, Buckinghamshire.

Her family moved to Madrid for three years when she was a few months old and she lived in a number of locations through the rest of her childhood. Roberts was educated at Warwick University between 1967 and 1969, being taught by historian E. P. Thompson. Her career in journalism began at the Northampton Chronicle & Echo in 1969, remaining with the publication until 1971.

Roberts was employed on the Weekend World (1972–77), The London Programme (1977–79) and This Week from 1988. She worked on the short-lived tabloid the News on Sunday, and has contributed to The Times, Evening Standard, New Statesman and The Independent. She first joined the staff of The Observer in 1990, where she was formerly a leader writer.

Roberts is a senior fellow at the Young Foundation. She has two daughters, Zoe Pilger (born 1984), from a former relationship with journalist John Pilger. and Grace Scott with her husband Stephen Scott who was a producer on BBC's Panorama for a number of years.

During 2016–17, she was the first Political Writer in Residence at Sussex University.

Views
Roberts compares Jeremy Corbyn to Clement Attlee.  She maintains both stuck to principles that the people were ready to accept.  Roberts wrote, "What many of the so-called expert political analysts and Labour MPs who rate polish and pragmatism over consistency and conviction failed to recognise is precisely what many of the young spotted immediately – Corbyn’s integrity.  Whatever his alleged failings as a manager of colleagues, younger voters have been attracted to his unashamedly steadfast leftwing vision. One that promises investment in the NHS, in childcare, in schools, in social care, renationalising utilities, making the state a catalyst for higher skills, improved production, more money raised from tax revenues as the number of real jobs grow and, along with it, the economic security and hope of ordinary families, for so long absent".

Roberts maintains the system frequently fails psychiatric patients. Roberts wrote about Sarah Reed, a seriously mentally ill woman who died on remand in Holloway Prison following what Roberts and a coroner's inquest considered neglect and inappropriate treatment. According to Roberts: "The inability of mental health services to cope means thousands of vulnerable women like Sarah are on a conveyor belt to understaffed prisons where, frequently, harsh discipline is imposed".

References

1948 births
Living people
British journalists
People from Newport Pagnell